Tsukubamonas is a monotypic genus of excavates that contains a single species, Tsukubamonas globosa Yabuki et al. 2011.
T. globosa is a free-living flagellate that was isolated from a pond in the University of Tsukuba, Japan.

Structure 
Presence of nucleus, endoplasmic reticulum, vesicles, food vacuole, mitochondria with tubular cristae, two flagellated basal bodies and two unflagellated basal bodies, three major microtubular roots, four major fibers, one Microtubule organizing center (MTOC), several internal microtubules and absence of Golgi apparatus.

References 

Excavata classes
Monotypic eukaryote classes